Trichophysetis gracilentalis is a moth in the family Crambidae. It is found in Myanmar.

References

Cybalomiinae
Moths described in 1890
Moths of Asia